Duane Doty (1834–November 17, 1902) was an American educator and town administrator that served as superintendent of the public school systems in Detroit and Chicago, and who worked for the Pullman Car Company as the town manager of their company town of Pullman, Illinois.

Early life
Doty was born in 1834 in Ohio. His father was Samuel Doty.

Doty attended the University of Michigan, graduating in 1856.

Career

Educational
Doty was hired in 1864 as superintendent of schools in Detroit. He held this job for ten years. Since the state's only normal school, the Michigan State Normal School, was producing an insufficient number of teachers to meet the demand in Detroit, in 1868 Doty launched an experimental teacher training course that was offered to select female seniors at Detroit high schools. Doty also attempted, unsuccessfully, to create a normal school in Detroit. Doty also served a stint as the secretary of the Detroit Board of Education.

Doty was a staunch Democrat. In 1868, 1870 and 1874, Doty was the party's nominee for Michigan Superintendent of Public Instruction. In 1874, his candidacy was also backed by the Independent Reform Party.

In January 1875, Doty joined the book buying firm of E. B. Smith & Co. He resigned as superintendent. Later in 1875, Doty moved to Chicago to serve as assistant superintendent of Chicago Public Schools, a job he was appointed to by the Chicago Board of Education on September 14 of that year.

From 1877 until 1880, he served as Superintendent of Chicago Public Schools. He was appointed in June 1877 after the resignation of Josiah Little Pickard, who alleged that the Chicago Board of Education had pushed him out in order to appoint Doty, an allegation which Doty denied was true.

On June 25, 1880, Doty was removed from office by the Chicago Board of Education, which installed Central High School principal George R. Howland as his successor.

In 1885, Doty submitted an application with the United States Department of the Interior seeking to be appointed as United States Commissioner of Education.

Pullman Car Company
After being fired as superintendent, Doty left the field of education, taking a job with the Pullman Car Company. He would serve as the inaugural town manager of the company town of Pullman, Illinois. Doty is believed to have possibly have shaped the vision for the town's schools. His wife, Margarita Doty, was involved in Pullman as well, including being responsible for writing an 1893 guide to the town, which spoke glowingly of it.

Doty conducted reports and studies about railroads for the Pullman Car Company. Doty also, anonymously, did publicity work for Pullman Car Company.

Death
Doty died November 17, 1902 at his daughter's home in Pullman. He was survived by his daughter and his son.

Legacy
The Duane Doty School in Detroit is named for Doty. Doty Avenue, in the Pullman area of Chicago, is named for Doty.

References

1834 births
1902 deaths
People from Chicago
People from Detroit
Educators from Illinois
Educators from Michigan
Educators from Ohio
University of Michigan alumni
Superintendents of Chicago Public Schools
Superintendents of Detroit Public Schools Community District
Michigan Democrats
Illinois Democrats
18th-century American politicians
18th-century American educators